Algorithmics is the systematic study of the design and analysis of algorithms. It is fundamental and one of the oldest fields of computer science. It includes algorithm design, the art of building a procedure which can solve efficiently a specific problem or a class of problem, algorithmic complexity theory, the study of estimating the hardness of problems by studying the properties of the algorithm that solves them, or algorithm analysis, the science of studying the properties of a problem, such as quantifying resources in time and memory space needed by this algorithm to solve this problem.

The term algorithmics is rarely used in the English-speaking world, where it is synonymous with algorithms and data structures. The term gained wider popularity after the publication of the book Algorithmics: The Spirit of Computing by David Harel.

See also 
 Divide-and-conquer algorithm
 Heuristic
 Akra–Bazzi method

Notes